Circles and Satellites is the second and final album by English indie rock band Rooster. Released on 24 July 2006, the album spawned the top-40 single "Home".

Track listing

Personnel
Rooster
Nick Atkinson – vocals
Luke Potashnick – guitars
Ben Smyth – bass, backing vocals
Dave Neale – drums
Additional personnel
Matt Wallace – production
Steve Robson – production
Ash Howes – mixing

References

Rooster (band) albums
2006 albums
Albums produced by Steve Robson